Hartmut Neven (born 1964) is a scientist working in quantum computing, computer vision, robotics and computational neuroscience. He is best known for his work in face and object recognition and his contributions to quantum machine learning. He is currently Vice President of Engineering at Google where he is leading the Quantum Artificial Intelligence Lab which he founded in 2012.

Education 

Hartmut Neven studied Physics and Economics in Brazil, Köln, Paris, Tübingen and Jerusalem. He wrote his Master thesis on a neuronal model of object recognition at the Max Planck Institute for Biological Cybernetics under Valentino Braitenberg. In 1996 he received his Ph.D. from the Institute for Neuroinformatics at the Ruhr University in Bochum, Germany, for a thesis on "Dynamics for vision-guided autonomous mobile robots" written under the tutelage of Christoph von der Malsburg. He received a scholarship from the Studienstiftung des Deutschen Volkes, Germany’s most prestigious scholarship foundation.

Work 

1998 Neven became research professor of computer science at the University of Southern California at the Laboratory for Biological and Computational Vision. 2003 he returned as the head of the Laboratory for Human-Machine Interfaces at USC's Information Sciences Institute.

Face recognition, avatars and face filters

Neven co-founded two companies, Eyematic for which he served as CTO and Neven Vision which he initially led as CEO. At Eyematic he developed face recognition technology and real-time facial feature analysis for avatar animation. Teams led by Neven have repeatedly won top scores in government sponsored tests designed to determine the most accurate face recognition software. Face filters, now ubiquitous on mobile phones, were launched for the first time by Neven Vision on the networks of NTT DoCoMo and Vodafone Japan in 2003.
Neven Vision also pioneered mobile visual search for camera phones.  Neven Vision was acquired by Google in 2006.

Object recognition and adversarial images

At Google he managed teams responsible for advancing Google's visual search technologies and was the engineering manager for Google Goggles. The concept of adversarial patterns originated in his group when he tasked Christian Szegedy with a project to modify the pixel inputs of a deep neural network to lower the activity of select output nodes. The motivation was to use this technique for object localization which did not work out. But the idea gave rise to the fields of adversarial learning and DeepDream art. In 2013 his optical character recognition team won the ICDAR Robust Reading Competition by a wide margin and in 2014 the object recognition team won the ImageNet challenge.

Google Glass

Neven was a co-founder of the Google Glass project. His team completed the first prototype, codenamed Ant, in 2011.

Quantum artificial intelligence

In 2006 Neven started to explore the application of quantum computing to hard combinatorial problems arising in machine learning. In collaboration with D-Wave Systems he developed the first image recognition system based on quantum algorithms. It was demonstrated at SuperComputing07.  At NIPS 2009 his team demonstrated the first binary classifier trained on a quantum processor.

In 2012 together with Pete Worden at NASA Ames he founded the Quantum Artificial Intelligence Laboratory. In 2014 he invited John Martinis and his group at UC Santa Barbara to join the lab to start a fabrication facility for superconducting quantum processors. The Quantum Artificial Intelligence team performed the first experimental demonstration of a scalable simulation of a molecule. In 2016 the team formulated an experiment to demonstrate quantum supremacy. Quantum supremacy was then declared by Google in October 2019.

Neven's law
The observation that quantum computers are gaining computational power at a doubly exponential rate is called "Neven's law".  

Hartmut Neven was named as one of Fast Company’s Most Creative People of 2020. Citing Neven: "It’s not one company versus another, but rather, humankind versus nature — or humankind with nature."

References

External links
 Keynote Presentation at the International Conference on Machine Learning ICML 2011 on Google Goggles and Machine Learning with Quantum Algorithms
 NIPS Video Lecture: Training a Binary Classifier with the Quantum Adiabatic Algorithm
 Google Tech Talk Series on Quantum Computing
 Preprints of Hartmut  Neven on arxiv.org
 Der Spiegel: Google und Nasa präsentieren Quantencomputer

Artificial intelligence researchers
Machine learning researchers
German roboticists
Google employees
German computer scientists
Living people
1964 births